Swn or SWN can mean:
 Something With Numbers, Australian Band
 Sŵn, a festival
 Southwestern Energy, based on its ticker symbol on the New York Stock Exchange
 Single-Walled Nanotubes